Griphosphaerioma is a genus of fungi in the family Amphisphaeriaceae. It is also in the Subclass Xylariomycetidae  and order Amphisphaeriales .

Distribution
Griphosphaerioma kansensis has only been found in Kansas within the United States of America, hence the name 'kansensis'. While, Griphosphaerioma zelkovicola was first observed in Japan on the bark of Zelkova serrata tree.

Species
As accepted by Species Fungorum;
Griphosphaerioma kansensis 
Griphosphaerioma zelkovicola 

Former species;
 G. symphoricarpi  = Valsa symphoricarpi, Valsaceae
 G. symphoricarpi  = Dothidotthia symphoricarpi, Dothidotthiaceae

References

External links
Index Fungorum

Amphisphaeriales